Mormo olivescaria is a moth of the family Noctuidae. It is found in the Jaintia hills in the Meghalaya state of India.

References 

Hadeninae
Moths described in 1897
Insects of India